Praso (Greek: Πράσο) is an islet east of Ithaca, one of the Ionian Islands in Greece.

Islands of the Ionian Islands (region)
Echinades
Islands of Greece
Landforms of Ithaca

References